Hotel Chippewa is located in Chippewa Falls, Wisconsin.

History
Located near a railroad, the hotel featured telephones in every room and fire escapes, both of which were groundbreaking at the time. The building has since been converted into apartments.

References

Hotel buildings on the National Register of Historic Places in Wisconsin
Residential buildings on the National Register of Historic Places in Wisconsin
National Register of Historic Places in Chippewa County, Wisconsin
Late 19th and Early 20th Century American Movements architecture
Brick buildings and structures
Commercial buildings completed in 1915